The Sierra Leone national cricket team is the men's team that represents Sierra Leone in international cricket. They became an affiliate member of the International Cricket Council (ICC) in 2002 and an associate member in 2017.

In April 2018, the ICC decided to grant full Twenty20 International (T20I) status to all its members. Therefore, all Twenty20 matches played between Sierra Leone and other ICC members since 1 January 2019 have been full T20I matches.

History
The history of cricket in Sierra Leone dates back to the Sierra Leone Colony and Protectorate when it was introduced by the British. In 1887, a Sierra Leone team played a two-day match against a team from the West India Regiments. International cricket dates from the 1930s when Sierra Leone began to play Gambia. In 1967 the West African Championships were created with former British colonies Nigeria and Ghana also sending teams. Starting in 1991, the Sierra Leone Civil War caused a decline in cricketing activity, with the country's main ground Kingtom Oval used as a refugee camp.

Sierra Leone was a member of the West Africa Cricket Council which became a member of the ICC in 1976 and fielded the West Africa cricket team, before being dissolved in 2003. The Sierra Leone Cricket Association became an affiliate member of the ICC in its own right in 2002 and made its debut at an ICC tournament at the 2004 African Affiliates Championship, where they finished last out of the eight teams. They returned at the equivalent tournament in 2006, Division Three of the African region of the World Cricket League, where they had a major improvement, this time finishing as runners-up to Mozambique, and only just missing out on promotion to Division Two.

T20I status (2019-present)
Sierra Leone gained T20I status in 2019 and played their first match against Nigeria in 2021.

In 2021 Sierra Leone was among five teams excluded from the ICC T20I Championship for failing to play enough fixtures in the relevant period, an effect of the COVID-19 pandemic.

Records
International Match Summary — Sierra Leone
 
Last updated 9 December 2022

Twenty20 International 

 Highest team total: 150/9 v. Cameroon on 2 December 2022 at Rwanda Cricket Stadium, Kigali
 Highest individual score: 46, John Bangura v. Nigeria on 20 October 2021 at University of Lagos Cricket Oval, Lagos
 Best individual bowling figures: 5/16, Abass Gbla v. Nigeria on 26 October 2021 at University of Lagos Cricket Oval, Lagos

T20I record versus other nations

Records complete to T20I #1949. Last updated 9 December 2022.

See also 
 List of Sierra Leone Twenty20 International cricketers
 Sierra Leone women's national cricket team

References

Cricket in Sierra Leone
National cricket teams
Cricket
Sierra Leone in international cricket